Hetepheres is the name of several queens, princesses and noble women from the Fourth dynasty of Egypt.

 Hetepheres I, wife of Pharaoh Sneferu and mother of Khufu
 Hetepheres A, daughter of Sneferu, wife of Ankhhaf
 Hetepheres II, daughter of Khufu, wife of Prince Kawab and pharaoh Djedefre
 Hetepheres B, daughter of Djedefre
 Hetepheres C, wife of Baka (son of Djedefre)

Literature
Dodson and Hilton: The Complete Royal Families of Ancient Egypt, London, 2004
Wolfram Grajetzki: Ancient Egyptian Queens – a hieroglyphic dictionary, London, 2005

See also
 Egyptian Fourth Dynasty Family Tree

Ancient Egyptian given names
Egyptian feminine given names